Erakeswara Temple is a Saivite Hindu temple located in the western side of Pillalamarri village, Suryapet district of Telangana, India. Erakeswara Temple is one among the four prominent and intricately carved stone and granite temples located in Pillalamarri village—the other three are about 250 metres east of the  Erakeswara temple. These include the double temples next to each other: Parvati-Mahadeva Nameswara Temple and Trikuteshwara Temple (both Shiva); and the third being the Chennakeshava Temple (Vishnu) in ruins that is a few hundred feet southwest of the double temples. They are all from 12th to early 13th century period.

Location 
Pillalamarri is located at a distance of 8 km northwest of Suryapet town, off highway 65. Suryapet is located at a distance of 153 km from Hyderabad on the National Highway 65.

History 
The temple was built in the early 13th century (c. 1203-1208 CE) by the Recherla chiefs who served as the feudatories of Kakatiyas. One inscription notes that Erakasani, the wife of Bēti Reddi of the Recherla family built the temple in 1208 CE in Pillalamarri. The deity Erakeswara is named after her, meaning "lord of Eraka". The temple was vandalised during the raids of Alauddin Khilji into the Deccan region in the early 14th century. An inscription dated to 1357 CE records the re-establishment of Lord Erakeswara by a local feudatory chief serving Kapaya Nayaka of Musunuri Nayaka dynasty.

Prominent stone inscriptions in Telugu about the history of the temple and of Pillalamarri are displayed in the temple premises. One of the stone inscriptions is dated to 1195 CE (Saka. 1117) and mentions the rule of Pratapa Rudra I. Another stone inscription dates to 1208 CE (Saka. 1130) and makes a reference to the reign of Ganapati Deva.

One of the earliest archaeological surveys and documentation of this temple was completed over 1926 and 1927 by Ghulam Yazdani – an archaeologist and epigraphist, and published in 1929. In this study, the four temples at Pillalamarri were in ruined state and incorrectly named as:
Someswara Gudi (now identified as Erakeswara Temple or Yerakeswara)
Narasimhadeva temple (now Nameswara temple)
Mukandesvara temple (now Trikuteswara temple)
Rameshwara temple (now Chennakesava temple)

According to Yazdani, the temple in the northwest part of the village (Someswara, now Erakeswara) has several inscriptions, but some were modern. The Hindu masons of the medieval period had miscalculated the weights and this, he proposed, was the cause of the ruins and sunken floors he witnessed. The local ruler, patron and the builder of this and two other temples in the village was the Namireddi family, a Shudra by caste according to the genealogy inscribed on the stone in one of the temples, states Yazdani.

Architecture 
The architectural style of the temple is close to Ramappa temple and Kota Gullu, other Kakatiya era temples. The temple is placed on an upapitha and is cruciform in shape. It has three porticos in the east, north and south and a garbhalaya in the west. The sikhara on the inner sanctum (garbhagudi) is made of brick and lime and is decorated all over by miniature turrets. It is said that the stone used in temple construction has interesting acoustic properties. When the temple stone is tapped with a coin, it sounds like metal. The temple has intricately carved pillars and walls. The temple walls are painted with frescoes.

Gallery

References

External links 

Shiva temples in Telangana
Hindu temples in Telangana
Suryapet district
Hindu temples in Suryapet district